Mary Snell Rundle RRC, (1874 – 13 March 1937) was a British nursing reformer. She was the first ever Secretary of the Royal College of Nursing (founded in 1916) and co-ordinated the College's work for over 17 years.

Early life and career
Mary Snell Rundle was born in Saltash, Cornwall, in 1874. After her fiancé, a naval officer, died, Rundle decided to become a nurse. She moved to London to undertake her nursing training at St. Bartholomew's Hospital, where she was the first recipient of the Isla Stewart Scholarship. This funded a year of training in New York, which she took at Teacher's College, Columbia, in hospital economics and teaching in American nursing schools. She gained a certificate in massage therapy.

After returning to the UK, Rundle was appointed Assistant Matron under Rachael Cox-Davies at the Royal Free Hospital. In 1912, she became Matron of the Royal Hospital for Diseases of the Chest. During the First World War, from 1915–16, Rundle was Matron of the 1st London General Hospital Territorial Army Nursing Service. She received the Royal Red Cross for her war work in 1916.

The Royal College of Nursing
In 1916, Rundle was employed as the first secretary of the College of Nursing (later Royal College of Nursing). She managed the formative years of the College for almost two decades, before retiring in 1933 due to ill-health. She co-ordinated some of the College's early work in nursing education, employment rights and pastoral care for members. Before working at the College, she had organised some of the first postgraduate courses for nurses on tuberculosis care and health visiting. She also set up her own library. During her years at the College, Rundle was on the advisory board for the London University Diploma in Nursing.

Some of her most notable work was in nursing pensions, and she helped to bring in the Federated Superannuation Scheme for Nurses and Hospital Officers, launched in 1928.

In 1925 she was awarded the Diploma in Nursing from Leeds University. She was Vice-President of the League of Nurses at St. Bartholomew's Hospital, and was also a member of the first council of the Nation's Nurses and Professional Women's Club (later Cowdray Club), founded in 1922 as a members' club for professional women.

Mary Rundle died in London, at her home in St John's Wood, on 13 March 1937. Her funeral was held on 17 March.

References

1874 births
1937 deaths
English nurses
People from Saltash
Members of the Royal Red Cross
Date of birth unknown